Axiliad is a 1986 Polish drama film directed by Witold Leszczyński. The film was selected as the Polish entry for the Best Foreign Language Film at the 59th Academy Awards, but was not accepted as a nominee.

Cast
 Edward Zentara as Janek Pradera
 Ludwik Pak as Peresada
 Daniel Olbrychski as Michal Katny
 Ludwik Benoit as Wasyluk
 Wiktor Zborowski as Young Batiuk
 Krzysztof Majchrzak as Kaziuk
 Franciszek Pieczka as Forester

See also
 List of submissions to the 59th Academy Awards for Best Foreign Language Film
 List of Polish submissions for the Academy Award for Best Foreign Language Film

References

External links
 

1986 films
1986 drama films
Polish drama films
1980s Polish-language films
Films directed by Witold Leszczyński
Films about lumberjacks